is a Japanese company. They are part of the content industry, providing content and services regarding characters, games, education, and more.

History 

Imagineer Co., Ltd. was established on January 27, 1986 (registered on June 1, 1977) in Shinjuku-ku, Tokyo, with the goal of developing, manufacturing and selling game software. They acquired the rights to release overseas games in Japan, such as SimCity which they published for PC. They have also worked with companies like Sanrio Co., Ltd. on games featuring popular characters such as Hello Kitty.

Imagineer developed the Super Nintendo Entertainment System version of Populous, having acquired the rights from Les Edgar. At the time, the company was working with Nintendo. Imagineer also publishes the Medabots game series.

In 2016, Imagineer fully absorbed their video game subsidiary company, Rocket Company, merging into one company.

Games developed or published

References

External links 
 
Imagineer at MobyGames
Imagineer at GameFAQs

Japanese companies established in 1986
Video game companies established in 1986
Software companies based in Tokyo
Video game companies of Japan
Video game development companies
Video game publishers